Year 1576 (MDLXXVI)  was a leap year starting on Sunday (link will display the full calendar) of the Julian calendar.

Events 

 January–June 
 January 20 – Viceroy Martín Enríquez de Almanza founds the settlement of León, Guanajuato, in New Spain (modern-day Mexico).
 January 25 – Portuguese explorer Paulo Dias de Novais founds the settlement of São Paulo da Assumpção de Loanda on the south western coast of Africa, which becomes Luanda.
 1st May – Hungarian Transylvanian Prince Stephen Báthory is crowned king of Poland.
 May 5 – The Edict of Beaulieu or Peace of Monsieur (after "Monsieur", the Duke of Anjou, brother of the King, Henry III of France, who negotiated it) ends the Fifth War of Religion in France. Protestants are again granted freedom of worship.
 June 18 – Battle of Haldighati: Mughal forces, led by Man Singh I of Amer, decisively defeat the Mewar Kingdom led by Maharana Pratap.

 July–December 
 July 11 – English navigator Martin Frobisher sights Greenland.
 July 12 – The Mughal Empire annexes Bengal after defeating the Bengal Sultanate at the Battle of Rajmahal.
 August 11 – English navigator Martin Frobisher, on his search for the Northwest Passage, enters the bay now named after him.
 October – the Siege of Takabaru occurs in Japan, when the forces of Shimazu Takahisa besiege and take the fortress of Takabaru, which belonged to the Itō clan.
 November 1 – Rudolf II is crowned Holy Roman Emperor.
 November 4 – Eighty Years' War – Sack of Antwerp: In the Low Countries, mutinous Spanish soldiers sack Antwerp; after three days the city is nearly destroyed.
 November 8 – Eighty Years' War – Pacification of Ghent: The States General of the Netherlands meet and unite to oppose pillaging Spanish mutineers.
 December
 The States-General of Blois declares itself against the Edict of Beaulieu, beginning the Sixth War of Religion in France.
 James Burbage opens first permanent public playhouse, The Theatre.

 Date unknown 
 The 1576 Cocoliztli epidemic causes millions of deaths in the territory of New Spain, in modern-day Mexico.
 An early example of autobiography is written in English, by Thomas Whythorne.
 The Loci Communes of Peter Martyr Vermigli (d. 1562), edited by Robert le Maçon, are published in London. 
 The following schools are founded in England:
 Dartford Grammar School, by William d'Aeth, Edward Gwyn and William Vaughn.
 Sutton Valence School, by William Lambe.
 Konstanty Wasyl Ostrogski founds Ostroh Academy, the first university-level school in Eastern Europe.

Births 

 January 4 – Archduchess Catherine Renata of Austria, Austrian archduchess (d. 1599)
 January 5 – Anne Turner, English murderer (d. 1615)
 January 12 – Petrus Scriverius, Dutch writer and scholar on the history of Holland and Belgium (d. 1660)
 February 2 – Alix Le Clerc, French Canoness Regular and foundress (d. 1622)
 February 10 – Festus Hommius, Dutch theologian (d. 1642)
 February 29 – Antonio Neri, Italian chemist (d. 1614)
 March 14 – Eric of Lorraine, Bishop of Verdun (d. 1623)
 March 31 – Countess Louise Juliana of Nassau, countess consort and a regent of the Palatinate (d. 1644)
 May 17 – Joam Mattheus Adami, Italian Jesuit missionary (d. 1633)
 May 24 – Elizabeth Carey, Lady Berkeley, English courtier (d. 1635)
 May 27 – Caspar Schoppe, German controversialist and scholar (d. 1649)
 June 6 – Giovanni Diodati, Swiss-born Italian Calvinist theologian and translator (d. 1649)
 June 16 – Giovanni Battista Viola, Italian painter (d. 1622)
 July 3 – Duchess Anna of Prussia, Electress consort of Brandenburg and Duchess consort of Prussia (d. 1625)
 September 22 – Philipp of Bavaria, German Catholic cardinal (d. 1598)
 October – Thomas Weelkes, English composer and organist (d. 1626)
 October 6 – Roger Manners, 5th Earl of Rutland, eldest surviving son of John Manners (d. 1612)
 October 7 – John Marston, English writer (d. 1634)
 October 12 – Thomas Dudley, Governor of Massachusetts Bay Colony (d. 1653)
 October 28 – Rudolph, Prince of Anhalt-Zerbst, Prince of Anhalt (1586–1603), then Prince of Anhalt-Zerbst (1603–1621) (d. 1621)
 October 30 – Enrico Caterino Davila, Italian historian and diplomat (d. 1631)
 November 6 – Charles Günther, Count of Schwarzburg-Rudolstadt (1605–1630) (d. 1630)
 November 17 – Roque Gonzales, Paraguayan missionary (d. 1628)
 November 18 – Philipp Ludwig II, Count of Hanau-Münzenberg (1580–1612) (d. 1612)
 November 27 – Shimazu Tadatsune, Japanese ruler of Satsuma (d. 1638)
 December 20 – Saint John Sarkander, Moravian priest (d. 1620)
 date unknown
 William Ames, English Protestant philosopher (d. 1633)
 John Carver, first governor of Plymouth Colony (d. 1621)
 Giulio Cesare la Galla, professor of philosophy at the Collegio Romano in Italy (d. 1624)
 Santino Solari, Swiss architect and sculptor (d. 1646)
 probable – Jesper Mattson Cruus af Edeby, Swedish soldier and politician (d. 1622)

Deaths 

 January 19 – Hans Sachs, German Meistersinger (b. 1494)
 January 27 – Mizuno Nobumoto, Japanese shōgun
 February 10 – Wilhelm/Guilielmus Xylander, German classical scholar (b. 1532)
 February 12 – John Albert I, Duke of Mecklenburg (b. 1525)
 March 5 – Luis de Requesens y Zúñiga, Spanish governor of the Netherlands (b. 1528)
 March 18 – Johann Stössel, German theologian (b. 1524)
 May 14 – Tahmasp I, Shah of Persia (b. 1514)
 May 30 – Harada Naomasa, Japanese samurai
 June 30 – Franciscus Sonnius, Dutch counter-Reformation theologian (b. 1506)
 July 2 – Josias Simler, Swiss scholar (b. 1530)
 July 11 – Eleonora di Garzia di Toledo, Italian noble (d. 1553)
 July 16 – Isabella de' Medici, Italian noble (d. 1542)
 August 15 or August 22 – Bálint Bakfark, Hungarian composer and lutenist (b. 1507)
 August 27 – Titian, Italian painter (b. c. 1489)
 September 21 – Gerolamo Cardano, Italian mathematician, physician, astrologer and gambler (b. 1502)
 September 22 – Walter Devereux, 1st Earl of Essex (b. 1541)
 October 12 – Maximilian II, Holy Roman Emperor (b. 1527)
 October 14 – Konrad Heresbach, German Calvinist (b. 1496)
 October 26 – Frederick III, Elector Palatine, ruler from the house of Wittelsbach (b. 1515)
 November 4 – John Paulet, 2nd Marquess of Winchester (b. c. 1510)
 November 9 – Chamaraja Wodeyar IV, King of Mysore (b. 1507)
 date unknown
 Paula Vicente, Portuguese artist, musician and writer (b. 1519)
 probable
 Anthony More, Dutch portrait painter (b. 1512)
 Nicola Vicentino, Italian music theorist and composer (b. 1511)

References